Inape circumsetae is a species of moth of the family Tortricidae and is endemic to Colombia.

There is a complicated pattern on the forewings, consisting of a dark brown region in the basal area, bordered by a pinkish grey area with small patches of pale yellow, brown and beige. The apical area is grey, mixed with copper and dark brown scaling. The hindwings are white with irregular light grey-brown marbling.

References

Moths described in 2003
Endemic fauna of Colombia
circumsetae
Moths of South America
Taxa named by Józef Razowski